The Jim Phelan National Coach of the Year Award (formerly called the CollegeInsider.com National Coach of the Year Award from 2003 to 2009) is an award given annually to the most outstanding men's college basketball head coach in NCAA Division I (non-mid-major conference) competition. The award was established in 2003 and was renamed for head coach Jim Phelan, who coached at Mount St. Mary's. Phelan spent his entire 49-year coaching career at MSMU, compiling 830 wins in 1,354 games. He was inducted into the National Collegiate Basketball Hall of Fame in 2008.

Winners

Winners by school

References
General

Specific

External links
Official site
CollegeInsider's JPA 

Awards established in 2003
College basketball coach of the year awards in the United States